L. densifolia may refer to:

 Lithomyrtus densifolia, an Oceanian myrtle
 Lulesia densifolia, a tropical fungus